Sainte-Victoire-de-Sorel is a municipality located in the Pierre-De Saurel Regional County Municipality of Quebec (Canada), in the administrative region of Montérégie. The population as of the Canada 2011 Census was 2,501.

Demographics

Population
Population trend:

Language
Mother tongue language (2006)

See also
List of municipalities in Quebec

References

Municipalities in Quebec
Incorporated places in Pierre-De Saurel Regional County Municipality